is a paraphilia, specifically a sexualized attraction to the underwear or school uniforms of girls or young women. Burusera shops sell girls' used school uniforms, panties and other fetish items.

History
In the 1990s gravure magazines started to feature photos of girls wearing bloomers and school uniforms, some magazines featuring exclusively those types of clothes. Fetish shops selling these types of clothes also started appearing in Japan. Along with loose socks they became the symbol of high-school girls in the 1990s. They are also sometimes worn as cosplay.

Burusera shops
 
Burusera shops sell used girl's gym suits and school uniforms. They also sell other goods procured from schoolgirls, e.g. undergarments, school swimsuits for physical education, socks, stationery, sanitary napkins and tampons.
 
The clothes are often accompanied by ostensibly genuine photos of the girls wearing them. The clients are men who use the items for sexual arousal or stimulation.
 
Schoolgirls once openly participated in the sale of their used garments, either through burusera shops or using mobile phone sites to sell directly to clients.

Legal restrictions
In August 1994, a burusera shop manager who made a schoolgirl under 18 sell her used underwear was arrested by the Tokyo Metropolitan Police Department on suspicion of violation of article 34 of the Child Welfare Act and article 175 of the Criminal Code. The police alleged violations of the Secondhand Articles Dealer Act which bans the purchase of secondhand goods without authorization.

Child pornography laws imposed legal control over the burusera industry in 1999.  However, burusera goods in themselves are not child pornography, and selling burusera goods is an easy way for schoolgirls to gain extra income. This has been viewed with suspicion as potential child sexual abuse.

Prefectures in Japan began enforcing regulations in 2004 that restricted purchases and sales of used underwear and saliva of people under 18.

References in media
 In the Shin Kimagure Orange Road novel Summer's Beginning, main character Kyosuke Kasuga is disgusted when he finds out that his now highschool-aged younger sister Kurumi intends to sell her used leotards to a burusera shop.
 In the visual novel True Love, a key part to Mayumi Kamijou's route involves the player-character Daisuke, finding out that she intends to sell a pair of her panties in the local burusera shop. If Daisuke finds said panties, keeps them and gives them back to Mayumi when she asks for them, he will gain relationship points with her.
 In the video game Yandere Simulator, the player-character Ayano Aishi, can purchase a "dark secret" from Info-Chan as a favor. Info-Chan sends her a text saying that she has video footage of one of Ayano's rivals selling used panties to a boy from another school.
 In the video game Yakuza 0, a side quest involves the discovery, and ultimately the taking down, of a burusera ring.
One of the characters in the novel Consumed, by the Canadian film director David Cronenberg, references it while talking about school uniforms.

See also
Clothing fetish
Uniform fetishism
Panty fetishism
Shoe fetishism
 Panchira
 Zettai ryōiki
 AV idol
 JK business
 Cosplay restaurant
 Host and hostess clubs
 Maid café
 Hentai
Kogal
Gyaru
Upskirt

References

External links
DNA India report

Fashion-related fetishism
Women's clothing
Child sexual abuse in Japan
Japanese sex terms